Alvin Karadža (born 28 May 1984) is a Bosnian-Herzegovinian footballer who plays for FK Sloboda Tuzla in the Bosnian Premier League.

Karadža previously played for HNK Šibenik in the Croatian Prva HNL.

References

1984 births
Living people
People from Bugojno
Association football central defenders
Bosnia and Herzegovina footballers
HŠK Zrinjski Mostar players
HNK Šibenik players
FK Sloboda Tuzla players
NK Zvijezda Gradačac players
NK Travnik players
NK Iskra Bugojno players
Premier League of Bosnia and Herzegovina players
Croatian Football League players
First League of the Federation of Bosnia and Herzegovina players
Bosnia and Herzegovina expatriate footballers
Expatriate footballers in Croatia
Bosnia and Herzegovina expatriate sportspeople in Croatia